Szczekarków may refer to the following places:
Szczekarków, Lubartów County in Lublin Voivodeship (east Poland)
Szczekarków, Opole Lubelskie County in Lublin Voivodeship (east Poland)